The United Kingdom first participated in the Junior Eurovision Song Contest at the inaugural  which took place in Copenhagen, Denmark. The United Kingdom used a national selection format, broadcasting a show entitled Junior Eurovision Song Contest: The British Final, for their participation at the contests. The first representative to participate for the nation at the 2003 contest was Tom Morley with the song "My Song For The World", which finished in third place out of sixteen participating entries, achieving a score of one hundred and eighteen points.

History
The United Kingdom is one of the sixteen countries to have made its debut at the inaugural Junior Eurovision Song Contest 2003, which took place on 15 November 2003 at the Forum in Copenhagen, Denmark. Child-singer, Tom Morley, was the first participant to represent the United Kingdom with the song "My Song For The World", which finished in third place out of sixteen participating entries, achieving a score of one hundred and eighteen points. Morley and Cory Spedding sang both for the peace in the world and Joni Fuller described her feelings. The country's best result at the contest was placing second in 2004 with the song "The Best is Yet to Come". The remaining British entrant finished in fourteenth position in 2005.

A delayed broadcast, consisting of highlights, was aired on the main channel in 2004 and 2005. The inaugural contest, broadcast live on ITV1, averaged 5 million viewers. 1.9 million watched the 2004 contest on delay on ITV1 (221,000 watched the live coverage on ITV2). In 2005, the contest was watched by 700,000 viewers on ITV1 (down 63.16% compared with 2004 viewing figures), with 171,000 watching live on ITV2 (down 22.62% compared with 2004).

The  contest originally should have been organised by Carlton Television for ITV in Manchester. In May 2003, it was confirmed that the UK would take part in Copenhagen and host the next edition. ITV then announced in May 2004 that due to financial and scheduling reasons, the contest would in fact not take place in the United Kingdom after all. The EBU reportedly offered a further  of funding to produce the contest, but ITV stated that it would have cost almost  to do so, and they asked the EBU to find a new host broadcaster. It is also thought that another factor to their decision was the previous years' audience ratings for ITV which were below the expected amount.

Radio broadcasts
On 21 November 2013, it was revealed that Edinburgh-based 98.8 Castle FM (a non EBU member) would broadcast the  live to listeners in Scotland. The broadcasting rights had been offered by the EBU to its members, however when no-one in the UK took up the offer, Castle FM – previously known as Leith FM – moved in. The commentators were Ewan Spence and Luke Fisher.

It was announced on 16 October 2014 that the  contest would be broadcast on a radio station across the United Kingdom. Five local radio stations broadcast the contest, one in England (103 The Eye, delayed) and Wales (Oystermouth Radio), and three in Scotland (K107 in Kircaldy, Radio Six International in Glasgow and Shore Radio in Edinburgh). Cotswold FM, Fun Kids, Oystermouth Radio, Radio Six International and Shore Radio transmitted the  contest live with commentary again provided by Ewan Spence.

On 9 November 2016, Radio Six International announced that they would broadcast the  contest live. Ewan Spence, Lisa-Jayne Lewis, Sharleen Wright and Ben Robertson provided the commentary for the radio stations Radio Six International, Fun Kids and 103 The Eye.

Welsh debut

Before the digital switchover, the contest would therefore be a bilingual broadcast that would be broadcast in Wales on analogue, and on S4C Digidol in the rest of the UK. In the end, S4C chose not to broadcast the contest. S4C announced on 9 May 2018 that they would debut at the Junior Eurovision Song Contest 2018 to be held in Minsk, Belarus.

However, on 29 June 2019, BBC Alba announced that they would not debut in 2020.

UK return
In July 2020, it was reported that the British Broadcasting Corporation (BBC) were considering participation in the upcoming contest in Warsaw. The UK did not appear on the official list of participants as released by the EBU on 8 September 2020. At a Junior Eurovision press event in May 2021, the EBU stated that they were working to bring the United Kingdom back to the contest, possibly for the 2021 edition. However, once again the United Kingdom did not appear on the final list of participants for the 2021 contest which took place in Paris. On 17 December 2021, at a press conference between France Télévisions and the executive supervisor of the Junior Eurovision Song Contest Martin Österdahl, Österdahl stated that he was positive about talks between the European Broadcasting Union and the BBC about a potential return of the UK to the contest in the future. On 11 January 2022, it was speculated that the BBC were looking to return to the contest in 2023, the year marking the 20th anniversary of the first contest. The BBC internally selected Freya Skye to represent the United Kingdom with the song "Lose My Head" after an audition process held by the broadcaster. The British return proved successful, with Skye placing fifth with 146 points, winning the online vote.

Participation overview

Related Involvement

Heads of delegation

Commentators and spokespersons
The contests are broadcast online worldwide through the official Junior Eurovision Song Contest website junioreurovision.tv and YouTube. In 2015, the online broadcasts featured commentary in English by junioreurovision.tv editor Luke Fisher and 2011 Bulgarian Junior Eurovision Song Contest entrant Ivan Ivanov.

Between 2003 and 2005, the British broadcaster, ITV, sent their own commentator to each contest in order to provide commentary in the English language. From 2013 to 2020, the contest was broadcast by various non-participating radio stations. In 2022, the BBC will broadcast the contest simultaneously on CBBC and BBC One. Spokespersons are also chosen by the national broadcaster in order to announce the awarding points from United Kingdom.

The table below list the details of each commentator and spokesperson since 2003.

See also 
United Kingdom in the Eurovision Song Contest – Senior version of the Junior Eurovision Song Contest.
United Kingdom in the Eurovision Dance Contest – Dance version of the Eurovision Song Contest.
United Kingdom in the Eurovision Young Dancers – A competition organised by the EBU for younger dancers aged between 16 and 21.
United Kingdom in the Eurovision Young Musicians – A competition organised by the EBU for musicians aged 18 years and younger.
Wales in the Junior Eurovision Song Contest

Notes and references

Notes

References

Countries in the Junior Eurovision Song Contest